Richard Joel Laird, Sr. (July 4, 1939 – December 14, 2020) was an American politician who served in the Alabama House of Representatives from 1978 to 2014.

Biography
Laird was born in Floyd County, Georgia, and graduated from Handley High School in Roanoke, Alabama. He was a businessman in Roanoke, Alabama, and in Randolph County, Alabama. He served on the Roanoke City Council from 1972 to 1976.

He died from COVID-19 in Carrollton, Georgia, on December 14, 2020, at age 81, during the COVID-19 pandemic in Georgia (U.S. state).

References

1939 births
2020 deaths
People from Roanoke, Alabama
People from Rome, Georgia
Businesspeople from Alabama
Alabama city council members
Democratic Party members of the Alabama House of Representatives
Alabama Independents
Deaths from the COVID-19 pandemic in Georgia (U.S. state)